Maidenhead Golf Club is a golf club, located in Maidenhead, Berkshire, England. It was established in 1896.

On 16 July 2016, the club signed an agreement with the Royal Borough of Windsor and Maidenhead, agreeing to sell back its 24-year lease early, thus paving the way for up to 1500 homes.

References

Golf clubs and courses in Berkshire
1896 establishments in England
Maidenhead